Five ships of the Hellenic Navy have borne the name Spetsai (Σπέτσαι), named after the island of Spetses, which played a major role in the Greek War of Independence:

  (1828–1831), a sail corvette bought from Laskarina Bouboulina, destroyed in 1831 at Poros during a rebellion against Governor Ioannis Kapodistrias
 Spetsai (1881–1889), a British-built steam gunboat, renamed to Aktion
  (1890–1920), a French-built ironclad warship
  (1933–1946), a 

Hellenic Navy ship names